Morbid Angel is an American death metal band from Tampa, Florida. Formed in 1983, the group was originally a trio featuring bassist and vocalist Dallas Ward, guitarist and keyboardist Trey Azagthoth, and drummer and vocalist Mike Browning. The band's current lineup includes constant member Azagthoth alongside bassist and vocalist Steve Tucker (initially a member from 1997 to 2001, from 2003 to 2004, and most recently since 2015), drummer Scott Fuller and guitarist Dan Vadim Von (both of whom joined in 2017).

History

1983–1998
Morbid Angel was formed in 1983 by Dallas Ward, Trey Azagthoth and Mike Browning, with vocals initially handled by Ward. After brief stints in 1984 and 1985 with Terri Samuels and Kenny Bamber, respectively, vocal duties were taken over by Browning and guitarist Richard Brunelle, the latter of whom joined in 1985. By early 1986, the band consisted of Browning, Azagthoth, Brunelle and bassist John Ortega, who recorded the group's first three demos Scream Forth Blasphemies, Bleed for the Devil and Total Hideous Death, as well as the 1991 release Abominations of Desolation.

Shortly after the recording of Abominations of Desolation, Ortega was replaced with Sterling Von Scarborough, and after one more show Browning was fired following a fight with Azagthoth. He was replaced by drummer Wayne Hartsell and vocalist Michael Manson, although after a short time both Scarborough and Manson departed, leaving producer David Vincent to take over as bassist and vocalist. After another demo, Thy Kingdom Come, former Terrorizer drummer Pete Sandoval replaced Hartsell in July 1988. This lineup released Altars of Madness and Blessed Are the Sick.

In late 1992, Brunelle was dismissed from Morbid Angel, reportedly due to substance abuse, and the band became a trio for the first time since its formation. After the release of Covenant, however, Brunelle's vacated position was taken by former Ripping Corpse guitarist Erik Rutan. The new lineup issued Domination in 1995, before frontman David Vincent left at the end of the album's touring cycle the following summer. Rutan also left around the same time. Vincent was replaced by Steve Tucker and the band recorded 1998's Formulas Fatal to the Flesh as a trio.

1998–2015
With Erik Rutan back in the lineup, the group issued Gateways to Annihilation in 2000. The following year, Tucker was forced to step down due to "family and personal problems". He was replaced by Rutan's Hate Eternal bandmate Jared Anderson. By the summer of 2002, however, both Anderson and Rutan had left Morbid Angel to focus on Hate Eternal. After a short hiatus, it was announced in May 2003 that Morbid Angel had begun recording a new album as a trio, with Tucker returning. After the release of Heretic, the band added Monstrosity's Tony Norman as a touring guitarist.

By August 2004, Tucker had left for a second time due to various "personal reasons, musical reasons and very logical reasons" (including health problems), with former frontman David Vincent returning to take his place. Erik Rutan also returned temporarily in the summer of 2006, taking the place of Tony Norman for a European tour running until August. After the tour, the band remained relatively inactive until May 2008, when it was announced that Thor "Destructhor" Myhren of Zyklon had joined as an official second guitarist, in time for the recording of a planned eighth album.

In March 2010, drummer Pete Sandoval was forced to step down from Morbid Angel after undergoing back surgery. He was replaced by Tim Yeung, who was initially credited as a stand-in but ultimately remained with the band on a permanent basis. The new lineup issued Illud Divinum Insanus in 2011. In June 2015, a series of personnel changes occurred – first, it was announced that Tucker had returned, although Vincent initially claimed that he had not left; next, Yeung confirmed rumors that he too had left; and finally, Destructhor announced his departure a few days later.

Since 2015
Morbid Angel remained inactive for the rest of 2015 and all of 2016, before announcing its return in January 2017 with new guitarist Dan Vadim Von and drummer Scott Fuller. The new lineup released Kingdoms Disdained later that year.

Members

Current

Former

Timeline

Lineups
Names in bold text indicate newly joined members.

References

External links
Morbid Angel official website

Morbid Angel